Oh Jung-se (born February 26, 1977) is a South Korean actor. He is best known for his roles in the television series Missing 9 (2017), When the Camellia Blooms (2019), Hot Stove League (2019), and It's Okay to Not Be Okay (2020) as well as the film Swing Kids (2018). He won Baeksang Arts Award for Best Supporting Actor – Television two years in row in 2020 and 2021.

Filmography

Film

Television series

Music video appearances

Theater

Discography

Awards and nominations

State honors

Notes

References

External links

Oh Jung-se at Prain TPC

Living people
People from South Gyeongsang Province
1977 births
21st-century South Korean male actors
South Korean male film actors
South Korean male television actors
South Korean male stage actors